In Zoroastrianism, Spənta Ārmaiti (Avestan 𐬯𐬞𐬆𐬧𐬙𐬀 𐬁𐬭𐬨𐬀𐬌𐬙𐬌 for "Bounteous Harmony" or "Holy Devotion") is one of the Amesha Spentas, the seven divine manifestations of Wisdom and Ahura Mazda. While older sources present the Amesha Spentas more as abstract entities, in later sources Spenta Armaiti is personified as a female divinity with connotations of harmony and devotion.

Name
Spenta Armaiti is known in later Iranian languages as Spandarmad (in Middle Persian) and Isfandārmaḏ (in Modern Persian).

Sometimes Armaiti is paired with other Zoroastrian deity, Zam ('earth'), another being associated with the Earth, thus forming a compound Zam-Armaiti or Zam-Armatay.

Cultic role
In Zoroastrian religion, Spenta Armaiti is seen as the wife or companion of major deity Ahura Mazda, who, in some accounts, is described as her creator or father.

She is associated with earth and sacred literature describes her role as a Mother Nature character. Thus, she is linked to fertility and to farmers.

She is also associated with the dead.

Religious legacy
In the Zoroastrian calendar, she is associated with the twelfth month and the fifth day of the month. The fifth day of the twelfth month is hence her holy day, Sepandārmazgān. Sepandārmazgān is an ancient festival to celebrate eternal love. Iranian lovers give each other gifts on this day.

Parallels
Scholarship states that Armaiti is equivalent to a RigVedic entity named Aramati.

In Armenian mythology, her name appears as Sandaramet.

Footnotes

References

External links
Armaiti in Encyclopedia Iranica

Yazatas
Earth goddesses